Impulse is a 1990 American neo-noir film directed by Sondra Locke, and starring Theresa Russell, Jeff Fahey, and George Dzundza. It follows a female police officer who works as an undercover prostitute in Los Angeles, who unwittingly finds herself at the center of a murder investigation.

Plot
Lottie Mason is an LAPD officer who works vice squad as a decoy prostitute. She is faced with a number of problems in her career, including being sexually harassed by her superior, Lieutenant Joe Morgan. As part of her work agreement, Lottie regularly visits with Dr. Gardner, a psychiatrist, where she confesses that she finds her sting operations thrilling, and that she often fantasizes about "losing control." Stan Harris, a detective in the department, begins to romance Lottie. She is initially evasive, but the two soon go on a date together and become intimate.

After an intense sting operation ends with Lottie killing a drug dealer and two of his thugs, she heads home, rattled, and suffers a tire blowout en route. She pulls into a gas station to have a serviceman replace the tire and has a drink at a bar across the street while she waits. At the bar, she is approached by Tony Perón, a mobster and key witness in the pending trial of a kingpin named Luna; Tony has recently fled New York City and gone into hiding in Los Angeles. Unaware of his identity, Lottie coyly pretends to be a prostitute, introducing herself using the pseudonym "Carla". Tony asks Lottie to accompany him back to a mansion in Beverly Hills, to which she impulsively agrees. Once there, Lottie excuses herself to the bathroom, only to hear gunshots ring out moments later. She hides in the bathroom as a killer wanders through the home before leaving. When she returns downstairs, Lottie finds Tony's dead body. Lottie wipes away her fingerprints in the bathroom and phones 911, disguising her voice. In Tony's pocket, she finds an airport locker key, which she takes with her. Shortly after, police—Stan among them—arrive at the crime scene.

A curious Lottie drives to the Los Angeles International Airport to access the locker and is shocked to find a suitcase inside full of $1 million in hundred-dollar bills. She leaves the suitcase in the locker and returns home, only to find coverage of Tony's murder on national news. Stan and other law enforcement interview witnesses at the bar who saw Tony leave with Lottie, and a forensic sketch is created. Lottie returns to the airport and absconds with the suitcase, which she hides in her apartment, unsure of what to do with it.

Lottie visits Stan and spends the night at his house, during which the two have sex. In the morning, Lottie attempts to confess to him what happened, but is unable to. While studying the sketch and 911 audio tapes, Stan begins to suspect Lottie may be the mysterious "Carla". That night, he returns home drunk and confronts Lottie about Tony's murder, believing that she killed him; however, Lottie explains what occurred, though Stan remains angry and betrayed. The next day, Stan visits the district attorney with a plan to set up Tony's killer: As part of the plot, a local Los Angeles newscaster announces a false "new development" in the case, parading footage of a sunglasses-clad Lottie, who proclaims that she can identify the killer.

That night, Lottie stakes out in an abandoned house, waiting for the killer. A stranger arrives, but soon leaves when police close in. When they finally stop the man, he claims he is innocent and was paid $50 by an unknown man to deliver Lottie flowers. Stan and the other detectives rush back to the house, where the killer has descended upon the scene, murdering the surveilling officer outside. When the killer—revealed to be a man named Vic Dimarjian—enters the house, Lottie shoots him to death. Before dying, Vic tells Stan he killed Tony to prevent himself from having to testify against Luna.

Lottie resigns from the LAPD and decides to take a vacation. Morgan, suspicious that Lottie has Tony's missing money from a drug killing in New York, is abrasive to her as she leaves the department. He follows her to the airport and confronts her as she opens the airport locker. Forcing her into a bathroom, Morgan grows enraged when he finds the suitcase full of baseball cards. Stan arrives moments later and incapacitates Morgan before giving Lottie the keys to his car, where he tells her he has stored Tony's money in the trunk. Lottie goes to retrieve the cash but decides against it. She returns inside to the airport bar, where she insists that Stan turn it in to authorities before joining him for a drink.

Cast

Release

Critical response

Caryn James of The New York Times called the film "amazingly pedestrian," concluding that, "after a harrowing failed drug buy, Lottie does lose control and steps into the role she has been playing. But instead of using that psychological twist to create something resembling a character, Impulse treats it as another piece in the jerry-built plot."

The Los Angeles Timess Michael Wilmington gave the film a middling review, though he conceded: "[it is] frosty-cool on top and hot underneath, full of sleek surfaces and nervous undercurrents. At times it succeeds. Director Sondra Locke uses a clean, uncluttered style. She doesn’t get swept away in action-movie froufrou and preposterous plot twists the way Kathryn Bigelow did in that other tough-lady-in-distress thriller, Blue Steel."

Roger Ebert championed the film, praising Russell's performance and Locke's direction, comparing it to Robert Bresson's ''Pickpocket (1959).

Home media
The film was not a success at the box office, though it performed better on home video when released in the fall of 1990. In January 2013, the film was released on DVD-R by the Warner Archive Collection.

References

Sources

External links
 
 
 

1990 films
1990 thriller films
American neo-noir films
American thriller films
1990s English-language films
Films directed by Sondra Locke
Films scored by Michel Colombier
Films set in Los Angeles
Films shot in Los Angeles
Warner Bros. films
1990s American films